Nakiyingi Veronica Lugya alias Vinka (born June 27th 1994) is a Ugandan Musical artist, dancer, singer and songwriter. She is signed under Swangz Avenue and Sony Music entertainment.

Background and education 
Vinka born in 1994 to Mr and Mrs Lugya grew up in Kazo with her dad and in primary 5, she went to live at her mum's place in Bweyogerere.

She went to Hormisdalen primary school in Kamwokya for her private school education. She thereafter joined Lubaga girl's school for her O' and A' level education.

She then joined Makerere University and graduated with bachelor's degree in Tourism and Hospitality in 2017.

Career 
Vinka started out as a professional dancer and worked with Jackie Chandiru, Sera, Maurice Kirya, Cindy Sanyu among others.

She later got an artist management job at Swangz Avenue, where she used to be Irene Ntale's manager.

While at Swangz Avenue, Vinka did voice overs for artists and did radio Jiggles and in 2015, her boss approached her and inquired if she could give music a try. She took on the challenge and started recording as an artist. In 2016, she left artist management to concentrate on music.

Her first single was "level" followed by stylo ft Irene Ntale, Towards the end of 2017, Vinka released her song "Malaika" which established her as a serious artist.

Since then, she has gone on to release more songs like "chips na Ketchup", overdose ft Voltage music, love panic, by the way, omukwano Guno, sure, Oluyimba Lwomwaka, bebe ft Inna among others. In 2019, Vinka signed a distribution deal with Sony Music entertainment.

Also in 2019 too, she recorded a song "Bebe" with Romanian singer Inna that was digitally released by Global records.

Controversy 
Vinka kicked a fan who tried to touch her genitalia while performing in South Sudan.

Family 
Vinka gave birth to a baby girl on Jan 10th 2021 with Fiancée Witta Nelson, a businessman and politician from Isingiro District.

References 

1994 births
Living people
Ugandan women musicians
Ugandan dancers
21st-century Ugandan women singers
Ugandan songwriters
Sony Music artists